The Port of Greater Baton Rouge is the tenth largest port in the United States in terms of tonnage shipped, and is the northernmost port on the Mississippi River capable of handling Panamax ships.

References

Ports and harbors of Louisiana